Paul Emil Maki (February 1, 1918 – September 4, 1974) was an American professional basketball player. He played in the National Basketball League for the Sheboygan Red Skins during the 1941–42 season and averaged 4.4 points per game.

References

1918 births
1974 deaths
United States Army personnel of World War II
American men's basketball players
Basketball players from Minnesota
Guards (basketball)
Military personnel from Minnesota
Minnesota Golden Gophers men's basketball players
People from Aurora, Minnesota
Sheboygan Red Skins players